Benin is divided into 12 departments (French: départements), and subdivided into 77 communes (see Communes of Benin). In 1999, the previous six departments were each split into two halves, forming the current 12. Each of the six new departments was assigned a capital in 2008.

See also 
 Communes of Benin
 Arrondissements of Benin
 ISO 3166-2:BJ, the  ISO codes for the departments of Benin.

References

External links
 
  http://www.ambassade-benin.org/article20.html
  Projections De La Population Du Benin Par Departement

 
Subdivisions of Benin
Benin, Departments
Benin 1
Departments, Benin
Benin geography-related lists